485th may refer to:

485th Aero Construction Squadron, part of the 27th Special Operations Wing at Cannon Air Force Base, New Mexico
485th Air Expeditionary Wing, provisional United States Air Force unit assigned to the Air Combat Command
485th Bombardment Squadron, inactive United States Air Force unit
485th Fighter Squadron, inactive United States Air Force unit
485th Intelligence Squadron (485 IS) is an intelligence unit located at Mainz-Kastel, Germany

See also
485 (number)
485, the year 485 (CDLXXXV) of the Julian calendar
485 BC